Yishtabach (Hebrew: "[ God ] be praised") is a prayer in the final portion of the Pesukei Dezimra morning prayers of Judaism known as shacharit, recited before the second kaddish leading to the Shema prayers. 

The theme of the number "fifteen" plays a pivotal role in the blessing; there are fifteen expressions conveying praise in the beginning half of the paragraph and fifteen words in the concluding blessing (after "Blessed are You, God..."). The number fifteen is an allusion both to the Divine Name יה (whose gematria is fifteen) and to the fifteen Songs of Ascents composed by King David (Psalms 120–34).

There are two themes of Yishtabach: God's power and might are deserving of our praise and adoration, and that one must continually praise God.

Since Baruch Sheamar and Yishtabach are both blessings, this gives the sense that Pesukei Dezimra is one single prayer. Yishtabach is not recited unless Baruch Sheamar is recited, because Baruch Sheamar is the opening blessing, and Yishtabach is the closing blessing.

Yishtabach is normally recited while standing. This is because Baruch Sheamar is recited while standing, and since Baruch Sheamar is the opening of Pesukei Dezimra and Yishtabach is the conclusion, they are both recited in the same manner. However, on Shabbat, some congregations have a custom to sit.

The author of Yishtabach is not known to this day. But with words 2–5 in the prayer spelling שׁלמה (Shlomo), this alludes to a reference to King Solomon.

Text of Yishtabach

References

Pesukei dezimra
Hebrew words and phrases in Jewish prayers and blessings
Siddur of Orthodox Judaism